Chronicle of Life is a 2016 Chinese television series starring Hawick Lau, Zheng Shuang and Vin Zhang. It is based on the Chinese novel Lonely Courtyard in Late Spring by Fei Wo Si Cun. The series aired on Zhejiang Television and Shenzhen Television from 1 February to 23 February 2016.

Synopsis
This story is about the Kangxi Emperor and Consort Liang from the Wei clan, the mother of Yunsi.

When Kangxi (Hawick Lau) was sixteen, he eliminated the traitor, Oboi, and his allies. A misunderstanding causes a loyal officer and Chahar Mongol prince, Wei Abunai, to be treated as a fellow rebel, causing his entire family to be sentenced to death. Ten-year-old Liang'er (Zheng Shuang) had to witness the death of her parents and brother. As she was escaping, she met the young Kangxi, who was being pursued by his enemies. Without knowledge of each other's backgrounds, Liang'er and Kangxi undergo life and death. Having left a deep impression on each other, they made a promise to meet again. However, Liang'er loses her memory through an accident. In order to protect Liang'er, her cousin Nalan Rongruo (Vin Zhang) changed her name to Wei Linlang, and took her into his care. The two grew up together and developed a special bond. However, Rongruo's father, Nalan Mingju, fearing that Linlang's identity would cause trouble for the family, secretly sent her to the palace to become a maid in order to prevent the two from being together.

Linlang thought she would end up dying a lonely death in the palace, but the appearance of Kangxi disrupted her life. Her reunion with Rongruo also gave her another ray of hope. Kangxi recognized Linlang as the young girl who saved his life as a child, and resorted to various methods to help her remember the past. Meanwhile, Rongruo plans to take Linlang and escape from the palace. Stuck between an overbearing emperor and her childhood lover, Linlang is at a loss.

It was only after Kangxi fell deeply in love with Linlang that he learned she was actually the cousin Rongruo was in love with all along. He decides to let the two lovers be reunited, but a twist of fate causes deeper misunderstandings and missed chances. After going through a series of tribulations, Linlang realizes that she has fallen in love with Kangxi. However, at this moment, she recovers her memory and realizes Kangxi was responsible for her family's death. Linlang's brother, Changqing, who has been ambushed to the palace as a eunuch, also shows up and reveals his identity to Linlang and pressurizes her to seek revenge for their family. Linlang and Kangxi thus become entangled in a sorrowful and heart-wrenching love.

Cast
 Hawick Lau as Kangxi Emperor
 Zheng Shuang as Wei Linlang
 Vin Zhang as Nalan Rongruo
 Michelle Yim as Empress Dowager Xiaozhuang
 Zhang Xiaochen as Changqing, Linlang's brother 
 Wong Yeuk-sam as Consort Hui, Rongruo's sister 
 Zhang Zhixi as Huazhu
 Cheng Yanqiu as Cuijun
 Liu Mengmeng as Yushu
 Liu Tianru as Yunchu
 Zheng Long as Xiaodezi
 Yang Mingna as Empress Xiaohuizhang
 Siqin Gaoli as Fangjing
 Cao Yan as Duanpin
 Norman Chui (Xu Shaoqing) as Oboi

Soundtrack

Ratings 

 Highest ratings are marked in red, lowest ratings are marked in blue

International broadcast

References

External links

Chinese romance television series
Chinese historical television series
Television series set in the Qing dynasty
Television series about China
Zhejiang Television original programming
Shenzhen Television original programming
2016 Chinese television series debuts
Television shows based on works by Fei Wo Si Cun
Television series by Linmon Pictures